United Nations Security Council Resolution 2067 was unanimously adopted on 18 September 2012.

See also 
List of United Nations Security Council Resolutions 2001 to 2100

References

External links
Text of the Resolution at undocs.org

2012 United Nations Security Council resolutions
United Nations Security Council resolutions concerning Liberia
2012 in Somalia
September 2012 events